"Lo Siento" (I'm Sorry) is the debut single from Belinda's debut album, Belinda. The song is a cover of the song I'm Sorry by Ukrainian singer Mika Newton.

Information 
The song was written by Lucy Abbot, Sara Eker, Cheryl Parker, Twin; adapted by Belinda, co-adapted and produced by Graeme Pleeth.

Cover 
 Nakanomori BAND - "TOY"

Track list 
Mexican CD Single/Promo
 Lo Siento

Spanish CD Single/Promo
 Lo Siento

Mexican CD Single/Promo Remixes
 Lo Siento (Remix Main Version)
 Lo Siento (Remix Radio Edit)
 Lo Siento (I'm Sorry)

Music video 
The music video for Lo Siento is just a background, shot on a green screen, with a variety of graphics and back up dancers. There is a part where Belinda has a long black dress and a pair of converse shoes and there is another scene where she wears a pink shirt. The video ends with a scene where Belinda is spray painting the words "Lo Siento" onto an imaginary wall, seeming as if she is writing on the television screen. She then walks away and the video fades out.

The music video was directed by Oliver Castro and released in September 2003.

Charts

References 

Belinda Peregrín songs
2003 debut singles
Spanish-language songs
2003 songs
Song recordings produced by Graeme Pleeth